Lubisi Dam is an arch type dam located on the Indwe River, near Qamata, Eastern Cape, South Africa. It was established in 1968 and it serves mainly for irrigation purposes. The hazard potential of the dam has been ranked high (3).

See also
List of reservoirs and dams in South Africa
List of rivers of South Africa

References 

 List of South African Dams from the South African Department of Water Affairs

Dams in South Africa
Dams completed in 1968